Kostas Martakis (born 25 May 1984) is a Greek singer, model, television host and actor, who rose to fame after appearing on Greek talent show Dream Show aired by Alpha TV in 2006. Following his participation, he released five studio albums and also participated in the Greek national final for the Eurovision Song Contest 2008 and 2014. In 2011, he participated in the second season of Greece's Dancing with the Stars, placing second and three years later he was in the backstage host featuring Doukissa Nomikou.  In 2013, he took part in the first season of Your Face Sounds Familiar.

Biography

Early life
Martakis was born on 25 May 1984 in Athens, parents Nikolaos Politis and Labrini Lymberopoulou of Cretan origin. Martakis has an older sister named Tina and a younger brother Nikos.

2006–2007: Dream Show and debut album
Martakis first gained fame on the reality talent show Dream Show. Prior he had also done modelling work and played basketball in the Greek professional leagues where he won medals, as well as majoring in computer technologies at American College of Greece. Shortly after his appearance on Dream Show, he signed a contract with Sony BMG Greece and released his first CD-single in the summer of 2006 titled "Panda Mazi" (Always together). By winter 2006, Martakis was singing alongside Despina Vandi and Giorgos Mazonakis at REX night club, while in summer 2007 he starting singing with Kelly Kelekidou and Dionisis Makris at "Romeo" summer club.

In June 2007, Martakis released his first studio album titled  Anatropi (Reversal). The album was generally well received, leading him to win the award for "Best New Artist" at the MAD Video Music Awards 2007.

In the summer of 2007, he also took part of the international competition New Wave Festival 2007 held in Latvia, where he scored 2nd place, winning 1st place in the public vote. Shortly after, he was booked by Sony BMG Russia to release an English album in all the ex-soviet countries in 2008, although this never materialized and his collaboration with the Russian branch was terminated.

2008: Greece's Eurovision national final

Seeing his growing popularity, ERT asked him to compete in the Greek national final for the Eurovision Song Contest 2008. Kostas Martakis competed in the Greek National Final with a song by Dimitris Kontopoulos, with lyrics by Vicky Gerothodorou. The song was "Always and Forever". and it was recorded in two different styles. The pop rock version of the song was originally supposed to be performed at the National Final, but the dance version was chosen instead by Martakis and his label. The winning entrant was "Secret Combination" by Kalomoira, and Martakis' entry "Always and Forever" placed second. Following the Greek national final, a Russian language cover of "Always and Forever" based on the dance version with the title "С тобой навеки" (With you forever) was released in ex-soviet countries, while in December 2008, "Always & Forever" was added to American retailer Abercrombie & Fitch's nationwide US in-store music playlist, thus indirectly introducing the song to the American market. 

Kostas Martakis and Danish-Greek singer Shaya were chosen to record a Greek-language version of Right Here, Right Now from the soundtrack of the Disney film High School Musical 3: Senior Year. The cover was titled "Mikroi Theoi" (Little Gods) and was released as a single from the Greek edition of the film's soundtrack, as well as being made into a music video with Martakis and Shaya molded together with scenes from the film. The music video was included as a bonus feature on the Greek edition of the film's home video release. Walt Disney Records, via its international distribution partner EMI, commissioned several local market, foreign-language versions of songs from the entire High School Musical series, although "Mikroi Theoi" was the only Greek version song.

"Fila Me" is another single by Martakis of which was made into a music video and released as a digital single. Martakis then took a break from recording and live shows as he was called to fulfill service in the Hellenic Navy.

In fall 2008, Kostas Martakis was the opening act for the Athens concert of Jennifer Lopez.

2009: Pio Konta

In March 2009, it was announced that Kostas Martakis signed with Universal Music Greece. The collaboration with Sony BMG helped spawn nine singles, but his departure from the label in 2009 was on good terms.

In June 2009, Martakis released a song as a digital download single titled "Pio Konta" (Come closer) composed by Swedish producers Holter & Erixson. On November 12, 2009, Martakis released his second studio album titled Pio Konta, which went platinum.

2011: Sex Indigo, Dancing with the Stars and Entasi

In early 2011, Martakis participated in the second season of the Greek version of Dancing with the Stars and was partnered with Maria Antimisari. He placed second on the show. In March 2011, he traveled to Moscow to record the duet titled "Sex Indigo" with Russian pop star Diana Diez. A video was shot in Ukraine by the director Alan Badoev, while the song will be included in both artist's new albums. The premiere of song  "Sex Indigo" was on March 18, the version of "Sex Indigo" in Greek "Vres Ton Tropo" (Find the Way) was premiere on April 28 and the version of "Sex Indigo" in Spanish was the May 4. The world premieres of the three versions were on the Official Facebook Group of Kostas and the channel of the artist on YouTube, the letter of the Spanish version of "Sex Indigo" was written by Juliana Lira and Fermin Lira, The Sex Indigo video was premiered on July 14 for the ELLO channel and the Russian version was released on November 11 in the Diana Díez channel Official On YouTube.

2012: Entasi, MadWalk and Musical Rent

Martakis released his third studio album titled Entasi (Intensity) on December 5, 2011. In the lead up to the album's release, Martakis teamed up with MAD TV and Hellas On-Line (HOL) for a special web concert previewing is new songs on November 24, 2011.

The MadWalk By Vodafone. was held on February 8, 2012 in the Tae Kwon Do arena, the guest host being Martakis who shared the presentation with Viki Kagia and Maria Sinatsaki. and performed with them as in his music video Entasi in the second act.

On February 16, at the theater Veaki, Kostas made his acting debut in the musical Rent. He played the decadent rock star Roger Davis, telling the story of a group of marginalized young people, trying to survive in New York of the 90s, who suffer poverty, love, passion, rejection and loss. The musical was directed by Themidos Marcelou and with the participation of the actors Ada Livitsanou, Antigone Psychrami, Aris Plaskasovitis, Vasilis Axiotis, Christos Georgalis, Themis Marsellou, Stergios Ntaousanakis, Indra Kein, Andreas, and Maria Vasilatou Kapatais.

Entries in Ellinikós Telikós and Eurosong

Awards and Nominations MAD Video Music Awards 
List of Nominations and Awards by artist Kostas Martakis musical career 2006.

The 'MAD Video Music Awards' are produced by the television and radio station Greek MAD TV. Although not affiliated with the music industry, are the most important awards of Greece now.
Held annually during the month of June since 2004.

Discography

Studio albums

EPs

References

External links

 ERT Biography

1984 births
Living people
21st-century Greek male singers
Greek pop singers
Greek male models
MAD Video Music Awards winners
Singers from Athens